Betty Ruth Smith was an American actress best known for her work in old-time radio.

Early years
The daughter of Mr. and Mrs. Sloan H. Smith and a native of Wichita, Kansas, Smith began taking drama lessons when she was five years old. By 1922, she was "well known to theater patrons" when she performed a dance number in a musical program at the Wichita Theater.

She acted on the campus radio station at the University of Kansas, from which she graduated in 1937. While she was a student at the university, students chose her as Homecoming Queen and Intercollegiate Festival Queen. She also acted in Little Theater productions in Wichita.

Career
After her college graduation, Smith took a job at radio station KFH in Wichita, having leading parts on The Phantom Theater, Parlor Playhouse, and other programs. While there, she also learned to write for radio. After 18 months on that station, she took a vacation in Chicago and auditioned successfully for NBC radio while she was there. In Chicago, she began working on network radio programs. In 1943, she became the star of The Romance of Helen Trent, a popular CBS soap opera. She had temporarily filled that role in 1942 when the star, Virginia Clark, had a baby.

Besides her work on Helen Trent, Smith's other roles on network radio programs included those shown in the table below.

She was also heard on Backstage Wife, Stepmother, and Mary Marlin. 

In 1942, Smith was designated the "radio actress with the most beautiful eyes."

Personal life
Smith married U. S. Naval Reserve Lieutenant Junior Grade Robert Francis Zech in 1943.

References 

Year of birth missing
Year of death missing
20th-century American actresses
American radio actresses
American soap opera actresses
Actresses from Kansas